Court Martial (Prijeki sud) is a Croatian film directed by Branko Ivanda. It was released in 1978.

External links
 

1978 films
1970s Croatian-language films
Films set in the 1940s
Croatian drama films
1978 drama films
Yugoslav drama films